The Munich Symphony Orchestra (Münchner Symphoniker) is a German orchestra based in Munich but active statewide in Bavaria. It gives subscription concerts at the Herkulessaal and the Prinzregententheater and, to a lesser degree, at the Philharmonie am Gasteig.

Kurt Graunke founded the ensemble as the “Graunke Symphony Orchestra” in 1945 and led its first concert on September 25 of that year as a benefit for the Bavarian Red Cross. Regular subscription concerts began four years later.

In 1990 the orchestra adopted its current name. The chief conductor since 2014 has been Kevin John Edusei, whose contract was extended in 2016 through the 2021–2022 season. Philippe Entremont holds the title of Ehrendirigent, or honorary conductor, and since 2011 the principal guest conductor has been Ken-David Masur.

The Münchner Symphoniker has recorded music for more than 500 films, including George Bruns' adaptation of Tchaikovsky's ballet score for Walt Disney's Sleeping Beauty, El Cid by Miklos Rozsa, Jerry Goldsmith's score for The Wind and the Lion, Christopher Young's music for Hellbound: Hellraiser II, Victor Young's score for The Brave One and Howard Shore's score for The Silence of the Lambs. It also performed the soundtrack to 1990s episodes of the TV series The Adventures of Young Indiana Jones.

Chief conductors
 Kurt Graunke (1945−1989)
 Christoph Stepp (1990−1999)
 Heiko Mathias Förster (1999−2006)
 Georg Schmöhe (2006−2013)
 Kevin John Edusei (2014–present)

References

External links
 Official website
 Bach Cantatas page on orchestra

German symphony orchestras
Symphony Orchestra
Musical groups established in 1945
1945 establishments in Germany